Baihu Prison is a prison in Lujiang County, Anhui, China. It was established in 1953. Originally the Anhui Prov. No. 1 LGB. The prison is a particularly large-sized agriculture prison built on land reclaimed from a lake. It holds roughly 18,000 prisoners yearly making it China's second largest prison and Anhui Province's largest prison. GEOINT analysis puts the prison centre of mass as located at 31.241276°, 117.458221°, but there are a number of separately secured facilities all with high security measures visible on Google Earth.

See also
List of prisons in Anhui

References
Laogai Research Foundation Handbook

Prisons in Anhui
1953 establishments in China
Buildings and structures in Hefei